The Caracas Metro (referred to as El Metro) is a rapid transit system operating in Caracas, capital of Venezuela. , including Los Teques Metro, the Caracas Metro is made up of 52 stations.

Below is a list of the Caracas Metro lines and the stations that they serve.

Line 1 (Red)

Its initial section opened in 1983 as the city's first rapid transit line. It was extended thrice during the 1980s, reaching Palo Verde, current eastern terminus, in 1989.

Propatria
Pérez Bonalde
Plaza Sucre
Gato Negro
Agua Salud
Caño Amarillo
Capitolio – transfer: Line 2 (via El Silencio)
La Hoyada
Parque Carabobo
Bellas Artes
Colegio de Ingenieros
Plaza Venezuela – transfer: Line 3; Line 4 (via Zona Rental)
Sabana Grande
Chacaíto
Chacao
Altamira
Miranda (formerly Parque del Este) – future point of transfer to Line 5
Los Dos Caminos
Los Cortijos
La California
Petare
Palo Verde

Line 2 (Green)

Line 2 operates on much of the same route that Line 4 does. From north-east to south-west its stations are:

El Silencio – Point of transfer to Line 1
Capuchinos – Point of transfer to Line 4
Maternidad
Artigas 
La Paz
La Yaguara
Carapita
Antímano
Mamera 
Caricuao
Zoológico
Ruiz Pineda
Las Adjuntas – Transfer station for Los Teques Metro

Line 3 (Blue)

It started revenue service between Plaza Venezuela and El Valle in 1994; it was later extended to La Rinconada in 2006, but this section did not become fully operational until 2010, with the opening of the three intermediate stations.

Plaza Venezuela – transfer: Line 1; Line 4 (via Zona Rental)
Ciudad Universitaria
Los Símbolos
La Bandera
El Valle
Los Jardines
Coche
Mercado
La Rinconada – transfer: IFE railway station

Line 4 (Yellow)

Construction works for next phase were initiated 18 March 2007 and expected to be completed by year-end 2011. Line 4 was operates on much of the same route that Line 2 does.

From east to west:

Zona Rental – Point of transfer with Line 1 and Line 3
Parque Central
Nuevo Circo
Teatros
Capuchinos – Point of transfer to Line 2

Line 5 (Purple)

This line is still under construction.

First phase – from west to east:

Bello Monte
Las Mercedes
Tamanaco – Future point of transfer to Line 5
Chuao
Bello Campo
Miranda/Hugo Chávez (formerly: Parque del Este II) – Point of transfer to Line 1

The following stations found in the City of Caracas are under construction, as part of the project known as the Guarenas / Guatire Metro:

Miranda/Hugo Chávez (formerly: Parque del Este II) – Point of transfer to Line 1
Montecristo
Boleíta
El Marqués
Warairarepano – Point of transfer to the Guarenas / Guatire (light rail) line

Line 6 (Orange)

Most of this line is still in planning. It will connect Line 2 and Line 3.

Los Teques Metro (Cyan)

Las Adjuntas – transfer station to Caracas Metro Line 2
Alí Primera (formerly: El Tambor)
 Guaicaipuro
 Independencia

The following stations are under construction:

 Los Cerritos – projected completion date set for 2012
 Carrizal     – projected completion date set for 2012
 Las Minas    – projected completion date set for 2012
 San Antonio  – projected completion date set for 2012

Guarenas / Guatire (Teal)

This is a light rail line. The following stations are under construction, as part of the project known as the Guarenas / Guatire Metro:

Warairarepano – Point of transfer to line Line 5
Caucagüita   – projected completion date set for 2012
Belén         – planned future station
Guarenas I    – projected completion date set for 2012
Guarenas II   – projected completion date set for 2012
Guatire I     – projected completion date set for 2012
Guatire II    – projected completion date set for 2012

References

External links
Metro de Caracas, C.A. – official website  
Caracas at UrbanRail.net

Buildings and structures in Caracas
Metro Stations
Caracas
Caracas Metro (List of Stations)
Metro, Caracas
Caracas Metro